Suttor is a locality in the Isaac Region, Queensland, Australia.

Geography 
Suttor River is the western boundary of the locality and Suttor Creek forms part of the southern boundary, their confluence being at the south-westernmost point of the locality. The Suttor Creek coal mine is in the south of the locality. Apart from the mine, the principal land use is cattle grazing.

The Newlands railway system passes through Suttor, providing access to the coal-loading port at Abbot Point.

History 
The locality takes its name from the Suttor River, which in turn was named on 7 March 1845 by explorer Ludwig Leichhardt on his expedition from Moreton Bay to Port Essington. Leichhardt named the river after William Henry Suttor, who had given Leichhardt some bullocks for his expedition.

The mining lease for the Suttor Creek coal mine was obtained in 1994 with production commencing in the open-cut mine in February 2004. It is estimated that coal will be mined until 2038.

References 

Isaac Region
Localities in Queensland